Sarah Israelit Groll (1925–2007) was an Israeli Egyptologist and linguist.

Sarah Groll was born 1925 in Tel Aviv, Mandatory Palestine. She studied at the Hebrew University, Jerusalem, under Hans Jakob Polotsky, and at Oxford she studied Ramesside texts under Jaroslav Černý. She published her doctoral thesis On the problem of negative sentences in late Egyptian in 1963. In 1972 she founded the Department of Egyptology at the Hebrew University. She died on 16 December 2007.  Groll's studies of the Late Egyptian verbal system deepened understanding of the ancient Egyptian language at this stage of its development.

Works
 Sarah Israelit-Groll, Negative Verbal System of Late Egyptian, Oxford University Press, 1967	
 Sarah Israelit-Groll, Egyptological Studies, 1983
 Jaroslav Cerny, Sarah Israelit Groll, Christopher Eyre, A Late Egyptian Grammar, 1984,  
 Sarah Israelit-Groll ed., Pharaonic Egypt : The Bible and Christianity,  Hebrew University, Jerusalem 1985
 Sarah Israelit-Groll, Studies in Egyptology Presented to Miriam Lichtheim, The Magnes Press 1990, 
 Marcel Sigrist, Sarah Israelit-Groll, Shalom M. Paul, B. Couroyer, Hans Jacob Polotsky, Krsysztof Modras, The Art of Love Lyrics : In Memory of Bernard Couroyer, OP and Hans Jacob Polotsky, First Egyptologists in Jerusalem, 2000

References
 Sarah Groll Obituary and funeral arrangements, accessed 16 December 2007

Israeli Egyptologists
Linguists from Israel
1925 births
2007 deaths
Israeli women academics
People from Tel Aviv
Hebrew University of Jerusalem alumni
Alumni of the University of Oxford
Academic staff of the Hebrew University of Jerusalem
20th-century linguists